is a town located in Aki District, Hiroshima Prefecture, Japan.

Kumano-cho is famous for the manufacture of brushes called "Kumano-fude" (Kumano-brush).

The town is adjacent to Hiroshima, Kure and Higashihiroshima, so it's also a commuter towns of those cities. As of August 1, 2013, the town has an estimated population of 24,009 and a density of 710 persons per km². The total area is 33.62 km². The altitude above sea level is about 230 meters at the basin of the plateau.

Kumano-cho is known as the best manufacturers of Japanese brush pens. The town commemorated its 90th anniversary since its establishment in 2008, and announced “The Brush Pen Day” on Spring Equinox for the purpose of reviving brush pen culture and the further development of brush pen industries. All of the town workers, business groups, and citizens are working together to appeal the brush pens.

References

External links

Kumano official website 

Towns in Hiroshima Prefecture
Japanese calligraphy